The 2013 Men's Ice Hockey World Championships were the 77th such event organised by the International Ice Hockey Federation. 48 teams representing their countries participated in seven levels of competition. The competition also served as qualifications for division placements in the 2014 competition.

Championship 

The Top division championship took place between sixteen teams from 3 to May 19, 2013. Sweden and Finland hosted the event with games played in Stockholm and Helsinki.
The IIHF's official final ranking of the tournament:

Division I

Division I A
The Division I A tournament was played in Budapest, Hungary, from 14 to 20 April 2013.

Division I B
The Division I B tournament was played in Donetsk, Ukraine, from 14 to 20 April 2013.

Division II

Division II A
The Division II A tournament was played in Zagreb, Croatia, from 14 to 20 April 2013.

Division II B
The Division II B tournament was played in İzmit, Turkey, from 21 to 27 April 2013.

Division III

Qualification tournament
The Division III qualification tournament was played in Abu Dhabi, United Arab Emirates, from 14 to 17 October 2012.

Main tournament
The Division III main tournament was played in Cape Town, South Africa, from 15 to 21 April 2013.

See also 
2013 World Junior Ice Hockey Championships
2013 IIHF World U18 Championships

References

External links 
IIHF Official Website
2013 Ice Hockey World Championship website

 
World Ice Hockey Championships - Men's
IIHF Men's World Ice Hockey Championships